The 2011 Collegiate Rugby Championship was a rugby union sevens tournament. The competition was held from 4–5 June at PPL Park in Chester, Pennsylvania. The men's tournament featured sixteen teams, whereas the women's tournament featured eight teams.

In the men's championship, Dartmouth defeated Army 32-10. In the women's championship, Army defeated Penn State 14-5.

Men's tournament

Overview 
The tournament consisted of four round-robin pools of four teams. All sixteen teams progressed to the knockout stage. The top two teams from each group progressed to the quarter-finals in the championship competition. The bottom two teams from each group progressed to the quarter-finals in the challenger competition.  Over 10,000 fans turned out to watch Day 1 of the tournament.

Pool stage

Pool A 
{| class="wikitable" style="text-align: center;"
|-
!width="200"|Team
!width="40"|Pld
!width="40"|W
!width="40"|D
!width="40"|L
!width="40"|PF
!width="40"|PA
!width="40"|+/-
!width="40"|Pts
|- bgcolor=ccffcc
|align=left| California
|3||3||0||0||88||7||+81||9
|- bgcolor=ccffcc
|align=left| Penn State
|3||2||0||1||33||48||-15||7
|-
|align=left| Louisiana State
|3||1||0||2||22||45||−23||5
|-
|align=left| Ohio State
|3||0||0||3||17||60||−43||3
|}

Pool B 
{| class="wikitable" style="text-align: center;"
|-
!width="200"|Team
!width="40"|Pld
!width="40"|W
!width="40"|D
!width="40"|L
!width="40"|PF
!width="40"|PA
!width="40"|+/-
!width="40"|Pts
|- bgcolor=ccffcc
|align=left| Dartmouth
|3||3||0||0||77||31||+46||9
|- bgcolor=ccffcc
|align=left| Utah
|3||2||0||1||50||39||+11||7
|-
|align=left| Notre Dame
|3||1||0||2||67||45||+22||5
|-
|align=left| Boston College
|3||0||0||3||5||84||−79||3
|}

Group B teams had the best knockout record  of the four pools, going 6-4 on day two.

Pool C 
{| class="wikitable" style="text-align: center;"
|-
!width="200"|Team
!width="40"|Pld
!width="40"|W
!width="40"|D
!width="40"|L
!width="40"|PF
!width="40"|PA
!width="40"|+/-
!width="40"|Pts
|- bgcolor=ccffcc
|align=left| Army
|3||3||0||0||60||32||+28||9
|- bgcolor=ccffcc
|align=left| Central Washington
|3||2||0||1||47||31||+16||7
|-
|align=left| North Carolina
|3||1||0||2||53||55||-2||5
|-
|align=left| Navy
|3||0||0||3||29||71||−42||3
|}

Group C was the only pool where all four teams registered at least one win in knockout competition on day two.

Pool D 
{| class="wikitable" style="text-align: center;"
|-
!width="200"|Team
!width="40"|Pld
!width="40"|W
!width="40"|D
!width="40"|L
!width="40"|PF
!width="40"|PA
!width="40"|+/-
!width="40"|Pts
|- bgcolor=ccffcc
|align=left| Arizona
|3||3||0||0||85||0||+85||9
|- bgcolor=ccffcc
|align=left| Texas
|3||2||0||1||43||31||+12||7
|-
|align=left| Oklahoma
|3||1||0||2||34||67||-33||5
|-
|align=left| Temple
|3||0||0||3||5||69||−64||3
|}

Group D teams went 0-4 in the knockout phase on day two.

Knockout stage

Championship

Challenger

Overall results
The following are the overall win/loss results and points differentials for the 8 quarterfinalists:
 Dartmouth 6-0, +85
 Army 5-1, +23
 Utah 4-2, +24
 Central Washington 3-3, +7
 Arizona 3-1, +80
 Cal 3-1, +65
 Texas 2-2, 0
 Penn State 2-2, -20

Women's tournament

Format 
The tournament consisted of two round-robin pools of four teams. All eight teams progressed to the knockout stage. The knockout stage is single elimination with no bronze medal match.

Pool stage

Pool A 
{| class="wikitable" style="text-align: center;"
|-
!width="200"|Team
!width="40"|Pld
!width="40"|W
!width="40"|D
!width="40"|L
!width="40"|PF
!width="40"|PA
!width="40"|+/-
!width="40"|Pts
|- 
|align=left| Penn State
|3||2||0||1||70||19||+51||7
|- 
|align=left| Virginia
|3||2||0||1||51||31||+20||7
|-
|align=left| Brown
|3||1||0||2||17||34||−17||5
|-
|align=left| Temple
|3||1||0||2||7||61||−54||5
|}

Pool B 
{| class="wikitable" style="text-align: center;"
|-
!width="200"|Team
!width="40"|Pld
!width="40"|W
!width="40"|D
!width="40"|L
!width="40"|PF
!width="40"|PA
!width="40"|+/-
!width="40"|Pts
|- 
|align=left| Army
|3||3||0||0||62||20||+42||9
|- 
|align=left| Princeton
|3||1||0||2||43||49||-6||5
|-
|align=left| Navy
|3||1||0||2||37||43||-6||5
|-
|align=left| North Carolina
|3||1||0||2||29||59||−30||5
|}

Knockout stage

Players
After the conclusion of the tournament, Rugby Mag selected the following 14 players on the All-Tournament team:

 Blaine Scully - California
 Peter Tiberio - Arizona
 Nate Ebner - Ohio State
 Tim Stanfill - Central Washington University
 Will Holder - Army
 Ben Leatigaga - Army
 Dave Geib - Army
 Nate Brakeley - Dartmouth
 Chris Downer - Dartmouth
 Nick Downer - Dartmouth
 Tanner Scott - Dartmouth
 Seamus Siefring - Navy
 Don Pati - Utah
 Tonata Lauti - Utah

These players were chosen based on the impact they had made during the tournament and also based on their potential to succeed at higher levels of rugby.  Of this group of players, Peter Tiberio and Blaine Scully have already played for the USA Sevens national team.  Al Caravelli, head coach of the USA Sevens national team, attended the tournament, and confirmed in TV interviews during the tournament that he was scouting several of these 14 players for the national team.

References

External links 
USA Sevens CCI

2011
2011 rugby union tournaments for clubs
2011 in American rugby union
2011 rugby sevens competitions